The 1964 Atlantic Coast Conference men's basketball tournament was held in Raleigh, North Carolina, at Reynolds Coliseum from March 5–7, 1964. Duke defeated , 80–59, to win their second straight championship, and third in five years. Jeff Mullins of Duke was named tournament MVP.

Duke defeated all three of their in-state rivals on their way to the tournament championship, beating NC State in the quarterfinal round, North Carolina in the semifinal, and Wake Forest in the championship game.

Bracket

References

Tournament
ACC men's basketball tournament
ACC men's basketball tournament
20th century in Raleigh, North Carolina
College basketball tournaments in North Carolina
Basketball competitions in Raleigh, North Carolina